John Joseph Sewell (10 February 1844 – 8 June 1897) was an English first-class cricketer active 1863–67 who played for Middlesex. He was born in Cirencester and died in Pietermaritzburg. He played in twelve first-class matches.

References

1844 births
1897 deaths
English cricketers
Middlesex cricketers
Southgate cricketers
Gentlemen of the South cricketers
Gentlemen of Middlesex cricketers